The Armenian cemetery of Limassol is located on the western part of the Limassol-Platres road, within the administrative area of Kato Polemidhia. The land was granted to the Armenian-Cypriot community by the colonial government of Cyprus in 1946, but did not become operational until July 1960, because of the Law that stipulated that cemeteries need to have a wall separating them from their surrounding area. This wall was constructed by donation of the then Mayor of Limassol, Costas Partasides, who was a member of AKEL. Until then, deceased Armenian-Cypriots from Limassol were buried primarily in Nicosia or Larnaca.

About 150 burials have taken place at this cemetery, covering less than an eighth of its total area. In 2003, due to the widening of the Limassol-Platres road, about 20 tombs were moved westwards. In the near future, the cemetery will be the start of the Garyllis river linear park, which will be completed in 2013 and will end up in the old harbour.

References

Armenian diaspora in Cyprus
Eastern Orthodox cemeteries
Cemeteries in Cyprus